Tamatea High School is a state secondary co-educational school located in Napier, New Zealand. The school was opened in 1975.

Robin Fabish has been the principal since 2015. He was previously Deputy Principal at Te Aute College and Head of Māori at Napier Boys' High School. Since Matua Robin started the school roll has consolidated and is currently 310 boys and girls. The school has a reputation for being a whānau (family) community. Being smaller than others in the city means that individual student needs can be catered for and there is less chance of anyone falling through the cracks. The classes are typically around 20-25 students and smaller in the senior school. The school population is 55% Māori, 38% Pākehā with the rest of the students being Pasifika and Asian.

Tamatea High School is committed to giving effect to Te Tiriti o Waitangi. This means that the school is working to ensure that mātauranga Māori (Māori knowledge) has parity with Western knowledge. The curriculum has a strong focus on te reo Māori (Māori language), tikanga Māori (Māori culture), local Māori histories, waiata and haka. Building a strong cultural identity is important for all students but especially Māori and Pasifika students is a foundation for academic success. The school sees this as an essential element of being a good treaty partner.

The teaching fraternity at Tamatea High school is very close. The collegiality is a real positive for teachers in the school. They focus on building strong relationships with their students and often go the extra distance to support student success. Students have a strong voice in the school which means they influence everything from the learning programmes to uniform changes to property programmes. The whānau of students are included in the goal setting process and tracking of progress. Three times a year whānau are invited to half hour conferences with our Whānau Group Teachers. In these conferences students lead the conversation about their learning progress and next steps. Regular communication with families is encouraged.

The school has three overarching goals:
1. All school leavers have meaningful pathways.
2. Accelerating the literacy and numeracy of junior students.
3. Improving engagement in classrooms.

Typical student pathways include university, further training through the programmes at the Eastern Institute of Technology (EIT) or direct entry to employment. Student learning programmes are informed by their school leaver goals.

Former principals

Ms Nicola Ngarewa (2010–2015) (left end of Term One 2015)
Mr Chris Nielson (2006–2010)
Mrs J S Paterson (2001–2006)
Mr R Roscoe (1995–2001)
Mr B Haque (1992–1995) (left partway through first term to take up position at Rosehill College, Auckland)
Mr W Dimery (1988–1991)
Mr J Ryan (1975–1988)

References

External links
 

Napier, New Zealand
Secondary schools in the Hawke's Bay Region
Schools in Napier, New Zealand
Educational institutions established in 1975
New Zealand secondary schools of S68 plan construction
1975 establishments in New Zealand